Douglas Fairbanks Presents is a 1953–1956 syndicated half-hour dramatic anthology series. Douglas Fairbanks Jr. was the host, and he sometimes starred in episodes. It was also known as Douglas Fairbanks Jr. Presents. A total of 117 episodes were filmed. The program was also broadcast in at least seven TV markets in Canada.

Actors 
The series offered Buster Keaton in his first dramatic role in the episode entitled  "The Awakening". British actor Christopher Lee appeared in various roles in sixteen episodes, including "Destination Milan".

Production 
Fairbanks was executive producer for the program, which was filmed at the British National Studios, Elstree, England and on location in England and in other parts of Europe. NBC Films was the original distributor, but by mid-1954, it had begun distributing a package titled Paragon Playhouse, while Interstate TV distributed episodes with the original title.

Herman Blaser was the production supervisor, and Lawrence Huntington was the director. John and Gwen Bagni wrote the scripts. Music for the show was composed by Allan Gray.

Recognition
In 1954, Douglas Fairbanks Presents was named the best non-network dramatic film series in The Billboard's Second Annual TV awards.

Other titles
The program had different titles in different areas. Those titles often included the name of the sponsor, such as Rheingold Theatre (when Rheingold Brewery sponsored it in New York City and at least 15 other locations) and Triangle Theatre (based on sponsor Blatz Beer's logo) in Wisconsin. In Melbourne, Australia the series was aired under the title Chesebrough Ponds Playhouse.

Episodes

Season 1 (1953–1954)

Season 2 (1954-1955)

Season 3 (1955)

Season 4 (1956-57)

Archive status
Out of an original total of 157 episodes, 53 episodes are currently missing:

	Series 1 Episode 01   "The Accused" (missing)
	Series 1 Episode 02   "The Scream" (missing)
	Series 1 Episode 03   "Little Brother" (missing)
	Series 1 Episode 04   "The Clock" (missing)
	Series 1 Episode 05   "Dialogue For Two Faces" (missing)
	Series 1 Episode 06   "The Surgeon" (missing)
   Series 1 Episode 07   "Lochinvar" (missing)
	Series 1 Episode 08   "Take A Number" (missing)
	Series 1 Episode 09   "Thought To Kill" (missing)
	Series 1 Episode 10   "Happy Birthday" (missing)
	Series 1 Episode 11   "The Five Pound Note" (missing)
	Series 1 Episode 12   "Destination Milan" (missing)
	Series 1 Episode 15A  "The Last Moment" (missing)
	Series 1 Episode 15B  "The Sensible Man" (missing)
	Series 1 Episode 16   "The Parlour Trick" (missing)
	Series 1 Episode 17   "The Outpost" (missing)
	Series 1 Episode 18   "My Name is Jones (missing)
	Series 1 Episode 19   "A Lodging For The Night" (missing)
	Series 1 Episode 20   "The Priceless Pocket" (missing)
	Series 1 Episode 21   "Sylvia" (missing)
	Series 1 Episode 22   "The Red Dress" (missing)
	Series 1 Episode 23   "Runaway Marriage" (missing)
	Series 1 Episode 24   "The Journey" (missing)
   Series 1 Episode 26   "Emerald Green" (missing)
	Series 1 Episode 27   "The Genie" (missing)
	Series 1 Episode 28   "The Heel" (missing)
	Series 1 Episode 30   "The Door" (missing)
	Series 1 Episode 31   "The Great White Bird" (missing)
	Series 1 Episode 32   "Forever My Heart" (missing)
   Series 1 Episode 33   "Moment Of Truth" (missing)
	Series 1 Episode 35   "Bitter Heart" (missing)
	Series 1 Episode 36   "The Death Of Michael Turbin" (missing)
	Series 1 Episode 37   "Panic" (missing)
	Series 1 Episode 38   "The Charm" (missing)
   Series 2 Episode 13   "Myra And The Money Man" (missing)
   Series 2 Episode 17   "Street Of Angels" (missing)
   Series 2 Episode 25   "One Way Ticket" (missing)
   Series 2 Episode 28   "Mr. Sampson" (missing)
   Series 2 Episode 37   "Stand By" (missing)
   Series 3 Episode 01   "The Patriarch" (missing)
   Series 3 Episode 03   "The 90th Day" (missing)
   Series 3 Episode 08   "Pitfall" (missing)
   Series 3 Episode 09   "Con Cregan's Legacy" (missing)
   Series 3 Episode 10   "Crime A La Carte" (missing)
   Series 3 Episode 11   "Room 506" (missing)
	Series 3 Episode 25   "The Sound Of Your Voice" (missing)
   Series 3 Episode 31   "Success Train" (missing)
   Series 3 Episode 33   "Borderline Case" (missing)
   Series 3 Episode 38   "Deadline: Vienna" (missing)
   Series 4 Episode 18   "A Likely Story" (missing)
	Series 4 Episode 24   "Guy In The Middle" (missing)
	Series 4 Episode 34   "Scheherezade" (Sound only exists – there is no picture).
   Series 4 Episode 39   "Together" (missing)

References

External links
at CVTA with episode list

First-run syndicated television programs in the United States
1953 American television series debuts
1957 American television series endings
1950s American anthology television series
1950s American drama television series
Black-and-white American television shows
Television shows shot at British National Studios